Nazem El Sayed (born 1975) is a Lebanese poet. He studied Arabic literature at the Lebanese University. He has published several collections of Arabic prose poetry, and his work has been frequently anthologized. He was one of the writers included in the Beirut39 selection of young Arab writers.

El Sayed lives in Washington, D.C.

References

Lebanese poets
1975 births
Living people
Poets from Washington, D.C.
Date of birth missing (living people)